Muhamed Tači (born 30 April 1981) is a Macedonian professional basketball Swingman who last played for KB Trepça in the Kosovo Basketball Superleague.

Professional career
In October 2007, Tači signed with Úrvalsdeild karla club Stjarnan. He was released by the club in November the same year. In four games, he averaged 15.5 points per game while making 47.5% of his three point shots.

References

Further reading 
 

1981 births
Living people
Alba Fehérvár players
Macedonian men's basketball players
Small forwards
Shooting guards
Stjarnan men's basketball players
Úrvalsdeild karla (basketball) players